HMS Medway is a Batch 2  offshore patrol vessel for the Royal Navy. Named after the River Medway in Kent, she was the second Batch 2 River-class vessel to be commissioned and is assigned long-term as Royal Navy guardship in the Caribbean.

Construction
On 6 November 2013, it was announced that the Royal Navy had signed an agreement in principle to build three new offshore patrol vessels based on the River-class design (more specifically, the larger  derivative) at a fixed price of £348 million, including spares and support. In August 2014, BAE Systems signed a contract to build the ships on the River Clyde in Scotland. The ships, which were designated Batch 2 of the River-class, were to be globally-deployable and capable of carrying out constabulary tasks, such as counter-terrorism, counter-piracy and anti-smuggling. As the first ship of the new batch, Medway included some 29 modifications and enhancements over the baseline Amazonas design.

Steel was cut, marking the start of construction of Medway, on 8 June 2015 at BAE Systems Govan shipyard in Glasgow. Rather than being launched in the traditional manner, Medway was rolled onto a semi-submersible barge and lowered into the water on 23 August 2017 and was officially named a few weeks later on 20 October 2017. Builder's sea trials began on 9 November 2018 and were completed by 11 December 2018. Her sea trials were completed in only 75 days, a record not seen since World War II. She was then transferred to the Royal Navy on 5 March 2019.

Operational history
Medway was commissioned into the Royal Navy on 19 September 2019. Arriving via her namesake river, her commissioning ceremony took place at the former Royal Navy Chatham Dockyard in Kent with her sponsor, Lady Fallon, the wife of former Defence Secretary Sir Michael Fallon in attendance. In the following month, her first operational tasking saw her escorting a Russian Navy cruiser through the English Channel.

Caribbean

In January 2020, Medway embarked on her first overseas deployment, assigned to Atlantic Patrol Task (North) on long-term guardship duties in the Caribbean. She made a stop for final supplies and fuel in Gibraltar in what was her first visit to the territory. After arriving in the Caribbean, Medway joined Royal Fleet Auxiliary support ship  to form a task group, offering nearby British Overseas Territories a range of support from disaster relief during the hurricane season to tackling all forms of illicit trafficking. The deployment also coincided with the COVID-19 pandemic and both ships were reported to be on standby to offer any support, if required. The Governor of the British Virgin Islands subsequently requested the assistance of Medway in securing the territory's borders in an effort to control the spread of the virus in late September. Mid-September also saw the involvement of Medway in a large counter-narcotics operation in conjunction with Argus, 47 Commando (Raiding Group) Royal Marines and the United States Coast Guard. The operation led to the seizure of cocaine with a UK street value of £81 million, according to the National Crime Agency.

In October 2022, Medway was involved in another drug bust. Three smugglers were detained and the vessel was destroyed. On 6 January 2023, Medway rescued five people from an ocean-going tug in strong winds near Sint Maarten after receiving an SOS message; the tug later sank.

In January 2023, Medway temporarily took over the role of the Falklands Island Guardship whilst her sister ship  underwent maintenance.

References

External links
 HMS Medway

 

River-class patrol vessels
Ships built on the River Clyde
2017 ships
Ships of the Fishery Protection Squadron of the United Kingdom